Marguerite-Thérèse Lemoine Despins (March 23, 1722 – June 6, 1792) was a mother superior of the Sisters of Charity of the Hôpital Général of Montreal.

Biography
Marguerite-Thérèse was the daughter of René-Alexandre Lemoine, dit Despins, and of Marie-Renée Le Boulanger.

Marguerite-Thérèse Lemoine Despins's upbringing shaped her future. Her mother had died and, at her own request, she was placed in the care of Marie-Marguerite d'Youville. She was placed by Marguerite d'Youville in the Sisters of Charity's house as a boarder in 1739. This allowed her to grow up within the religious community and observe the charitable work. Both of these would be key to her life's work.

References 
 

1722 births
1792 deaths
Canadian Roman Catholic religious sisters and nuns
Roman Catholic abbesses
People of New France
Christian abbesses by nationality
18th-century Roman Catholic nuns